Toni Morrison: The Pieces I Am is a 2019 documentary film, directed by Timothy Greenfield-Sanders, and produced by Johanna Giebelhaus, Timothy Greenfield-Sanders, Chad Thompson, and Tommy Walker. The film follows American novelist Toni Morrison who examines her life, her works and the powerful themes throughout her literary career. The film also features Oprah Winfrey, Russell Banks, Angela Davis, and Barack Obama.

Synopsis 
Toni Morrison describes her life, her works, and the powerful themes she has written about throughout her literary career.

Cast 

 Toni Morrison

Morrison was an American novelist from Ohio. In 1998 she earned the Pulitzer Prize for Fiction for her work Beloved (1987), and in 1993 became the first Black woman to win the Nobel Prize in Literature. She died on 5 August 2019, when the HuffPost, wrote that the "world lost one of its most important voices".

Reception

Critical response 
The website's critical consensus reads, "Toni Morrison: The Pieces I Am honors its acclaimed subject with a comprehensive, illuminating, and fittingly profound overview of her life and work." Metacritic, which uses a weighted average, assigned the film a score of 80 out of 100, based on 14 critics, indicating "generally favorable reviews."

Alan Zilberman of The Washington Post wrote: "The film suffers from some of the familiar bad habits of the biographical documentary. At times, Greenfield-Sanders provides too many images and too much context, almost as if he doesn’t trust his own subject. The use of music — more filler than necessary at times — is also cloying". Gary Goldstein of The Los Angeles Times wrote: "The remarkable documentary 'Toni Morrison: The Pieces I Am' does so many things so well that it’s often like watching several fine films at once. Look for this one to be front and center in its category come Oscar time." Nick Schager of Variety wrote: "Yet, inasmuch as it locates the heart of the author’s inspirations and attitudes, as well as her guiding ethos to capture grand national truths while focusing on the complex interior particulars of individual experience, 'Toni Morrison: The Pieces I Am,' at its best, serves the soul of its subject." Caryn James of The Hollywood Reporter wrote: "In The Pieces I Am, the outer self is enough to let viewers know that Morrison and her novels are treasures."

Joshua Brunsting of CriterionCast wrote: "It’s a captivating, if flat, meditation on one of the great artists of our time, and while it may lean into hagiography, there are moments of genuine introspection that make this more than worthy of one's time". David Bax of the Battleship Pretension wrote: "The film resists analysis in its essayistic plainness. Though Morrison’s writing is alive–jumping, soaring and diving deep–Greenfield-Sanders' film lays flat on the surface."

Accolades

References

External links 
 Official website
 

2010s English-language films